Róbert Pillár (born 27 May 1991) is a Slovak football defender who currently plays for Mezőkövesdi SE. He was also member of the Slovakia national under-21 football team.

Club career
Pillár was born in Bardejov. Róbert spent his early youth developing at hometown club Partizán Bardejov. In 2010, Pillár moved to FK Senica. He made his debut in the first league game of the 2009–10 season, against MFK Petržalka and has been a regular in defence.

Club statistics

Updated to games played as of 10 May 2021.

External links
FK Senica profile 

1991 births
Living people
People from Bardejov
Sportspeople from the Prešov Region
Association football central defenders
Slovak footballers
Partizán Bardejov players
FK Senica players
FC Hradec Králové players
FC Nitra players
Mezőkövesdi SE footballers
Slovak Super Liga players
Nemzeti Bajnokság I players
Slovak expatriate footballers
Expatriate footballers in the Czech Republic
Expatriate footballers in Hungary
Slovak expatriate sportspeople in the Czech Republic
Slovak expatriate sportspeople in Hungary